Racinaea flexuosa is a plant species in the genus Racinaea. This species is native to Bolivia and Ecuador.

Physical Description 
Racinaea flexuosa is a bromeliad with long, pointed, waxy, light green leaves. Its flowers are small pinkish buds.

References

flexuosa
Flora of Bolivia
Flora of Ecuador